Gevorg Shmavoni Geodakyan (12 August 1928 – 20 December 2015) was an Armenian musicologist. He headed the Music Department of the Institute of Arts of the Armenian Academy of Sciences since 1966.

Born in Leninakan (present-day Gyumri), Geodakyan first graduated from the Yerevan Komitas State Conservatory in 1952 and then completed his postgraduate studies at the Moscow Conservatory in 1956. He died on 20 December 2015 at the age of 87.

References

1928 births
Armenian musicologists
Soviet musicologists
2015 deaths
People from Gyumri